Municipal elections were held in Turin, northern Italy, in May 2016. Chiara Appendino, the candidate of the Five Star Movement, was elected after defeating former mayor Piero Fassino in the runoff.

Voting system
The voting system is used for all mayoral elections in Italy, in the city with a population higher than 15,000 inhabitants. Under this system voters express a direct choice for the mayor or an indirect choice voting for the party of the candidate's coalition. If no candidate receives 50% of votes, the top two candidates go to a second round after two weeks. This gives a result whereby the winning candidate may be able to claim majority support, although it is not guaranteed.

The election of the City Council is based on a direct choice for the candidate with a preference vote: the candidate with the majority of the preferences is elected. The number of the seats for each party is determined proportionally.

Parties and candidates
This is a list of the parties (and their respective leaders) which will participate in the election.

Opinion polling

Results

According to the Italian electoral law of 1993 for the Municipalities, if a defeated candidate for mayor obtains over 3% of votes, the mayoral candidate is automatically elected communal councillor (on this case: Fassino, Morano, Napoli, Rosso and Airaudo). The candidate elected mayor votes on communal council, but is not a member of it.

See also

References

2016 elections in Italy
Turin
Turin
History of Turin
May 2016 events in Italy
Elections in Piedmont